Notre Dame Law School is the professional graduate law school of the University of Notre Dame.  Established in 1869, it is the oldest continuously operating Catholic law school in the United States. ND Law is ranked 22nd among the nation's "Top 100 Law Schools" by U.S. News & World Report and 14th by Above The Law in their annual Top 50 Law School Rankings. It is ranked 8th in graduates attaining federal judicial clerkships and 7th in graduates attaining Supreme Court clerkships.

According to Notre Dame's 2018 ABA-required disclosures, 86% of the Class of 2019 obtained full-time, long-term, JD-required employment ten months after graduation. 41.5% of the Class of 2019 accepted positions at Large Firms, while 11.9% accepted Federal Clerkships, and 17.6% of the Class of 2019 Graduates accepted public service positions.

The school enrolls about 600 students and in addition to the J.D. degree it also offers dual JD–MBA and several a dual J.D. and Masters combined degrees (including JD/MS, JD/MA, JD/M.Eng.). It also offers the only American Bar Association–approved, year-long, study-abroad program, which is based in London.

History

Beginnings
Notre Dame Law School opened in February 1869. It was the second Catholic law school opened in the United States, and the oldest in continuous operation. The first was the law school of Saint Louis University, which opened in 1843 but closed soon after in 1847 (it was then re-opened in 1908). Despite its humble beginning, right from the start, the Law School required law students to have completed previous education in a thorough course in the liberal arts. This was uncommon at the time when Law School applicants only had to be 18. The first “principal” of the law department and Professor of Law was Matthew F. Colovin.  Other law faculty in the early years included Lucius Tong and Timothy Howard. The first class graduated in 1871 and consisted of three students.

"Colonel" Hoynes era

One of the most important names in the history of the school was "Colonel" William J. Hoynes. He was born in County Kilkenny, Ireland in 1847 and emigrated with his parents at age seven. He fought for the Union Army during the American Civil War. After the war, he was a student at Notre Dame from 1867 to 1872, and later went to Brunswick, New Jersey where he was editor of the Daily Times. Hoynes later attended the University of Michigan Law School where he obtained his LL.B. In 1882, Rev. Walsh, then the president of the university, invited Hoynes to take control of the Law School, which was in demise. Hoynes accepted Rev. Walsh's offer in 1883, and taught classes in the Main Administration Building and in Sorin Hall where a large room permitted him to set up a "Moot Court". The course of study was extended from two to three years. Hoynes was assisted in various subjects by John Ewing and Lucius Hubbard of South Bend. Under his tenure, enrollment in the law school began to rise immediately.

The university restored the old building of the Institute of Technology after it was damaged by fire in 1916, and renamed it Hoynes Hall in honor of Dean William Hoynes. It was given to the exclusive use of the law students who moved there from Sorin Hall. After the Law School moved to its own building, Hoynes Hall housed the Architecture Department until 1963 and the Psychology Department until 1974, and then was renamed Crowley Hall and became the house of the Music Department since 1976. In 1925 John Whitman was appointed by Dean Thomas Konop as the first Law School librarian, and the collection grew to 7,000 volumes. In 1921 Maxine Evelyn Ryer became the first woman to study law at Notre Dame and the first woman to practice law in St. Joseph County, Indiana. In 1944, statues by Eugene Kormendi were added to the building as part of a campus beautification project.

20th century
On October 7, 1930, the Law School was transferred to the new building located on Notre Dame Avenue. The beautiful Gothic building, which still stands today, has a large reading room. The second librarian, Lora Lashbrook, and the third, Marie Lawrence, grew the library's collection to 20,000 volumes by 1952, and 55,000 volumes by 1960. The increase of both the library collection and student population reduced the available space. Regardless, this was balanced by the expansion of the law school funded by a donation from S. S. Kresge, the namesake of the Kresge Law Library. Under the guidance of Dean Lawless the school started one of the nation's first programs allowing law students to study abroad, with a year-long program in London to study the roots of common law. In 1986 a further expansion added the East Reading Room and created the reference librarian offices. In 1990 alumnus John F. Sandner donated funding for the acquisition of the entire 120,000 volume collection of the Chicago Bar Association Library.

In 1970, Graciela Olivarez became the first woman and Latina to graduate from Notre Dame Law School. The next class to graduate women would be 1973.

21st-century

New resources for scholarship

In 2004, the Kresge Law Library became one of the few academic law libraries to own more than 600,000 volumes. This was accomplished mainly under the tenure of the fifth law librarian, Roger Jacobs, who also served as head librarian of the Library of the United States Supreme Court. Between 2007 and 2008, a new building, the Eck Hall of Law, was constructed to provide the Law School with an additional 85,000 square feet of classroom and office space. In 2010 Robert Biolchini, alumnus and entrepreneur from Tulsa, Oklahoma, funded the renovation of the Kresge Law Library, located in the renamed Biolchini Hall of Law. The renovated Biolchini Hall is 106,500 square feet, has two 50-seat classrooms, a seminar room, 29 group study rooms, and holds 300,000 book volumes and more than 300,000 volumes in microfilm. The total cost of renovations and expansions was approximately 58 million dollars.

Faculty hiring momentum

In recent years, the expanding Notre Dame Law faculty has attracted several accomplished scholars from other top law schools. In 2009, University of Virginia Law School Professor Stephen Smith left a tenured position to join the Notre Dame Law faculty. In 2012, Professor Barry Cushman, the James Monroe Distinguished Professor of Law and Professor of History at the University of Virginia, joined the ND Law faculty. In 2017, it was announced that private law theorist Paul Miller from McGill University would join the Notre Dame faculty. Samuel Bray, a remedies theorist previously teaching at UCLA law, joined the faculty in 2018. During the same period, long-time Notre Dame professors have been invited for visiting faculty positions at Harvard, the University of Michigan and the University of Chicago law schools.

Expanded urban presence in DC and Chicago
In 2013, new space was secured for the Notre Dame Law in Chicago program, which allows ND Law students to pursue their studies from an urban campus in downtown Chicago ("in the Loop"). In 2015, in partnership with Kirkland & Ellis, the law school debuted its Notre Dame Law in DC program, which allows students to spend a semester studying in Washington, DC.

In recent years, the school has hosted talks and events by many prominent legal figures, including Ruth Bader Ginsburg, Antonin Scalia, Clarence Thomas, Samuel Alito, Sonia Sotomayor, William Barr, and Amy Coney Barrett.

Deans
1883–1919: William J. Hoynes
1918–1923: Francis J. Vurpillat
1923–1941: Thomas F. Konop
1941–1952: Clarence Manion
1952–1968: Joseph O'Meara
1968–1971: William B. Lawless Jr.
1971–1975: Thomas L. Shaffer
1975–1999: David T. Link
1999–2009: Patricia A. O'Hara
2009–2019: Nell Jessup Newton
2019–Present: G. Marcus Cole

Admissions and rankings

Admission to Notre Dame Law School is highly selective. For the class entering in the fall of 2022, the median LSAT score was 168 and the median undergraduate GPA was 3.81.

Notre Dame Law School is ranked 25th among the nation's "Top 100 Law Schools" by U.S. News & World Report for 2023 and 14th by Above The Law in their annual Top 50 Law School Rankings for 2022. The law School is a top 10 runner-up for Elite Litigation boutique hiring.

Degrees
The law school grants the professional Juris Doctor, Master of Laws and Doctor of Juridical Science degrees. The Master of Laws program can be pursued either at the main campus in South Bend or at the Law School's London Law Centre in the United Kingdom. The law school also offers a Master of Science in Patent Law, Certificate in Patent Prosecution, and LL.M. in International Human Rights Law.

Job and clerkship placement
In the class of 2019, 167 out of 193 graduates (86%) secured full-time, long-term employment requiring passage of the bar exam within ten months of graduation.  The top 3 most popular destinations for graduates in the class of 2018 were Illinois (21.7%), New York (10.6%), and California (9.5%).  Furthermore, 41.5% of graduates in the class of 2019 found employment in large law firms (100+ attorneys) and 11.9% pursued federal clerkships. Notre Dame has been recognized as a feeder school for federal clerks and in recent years has placed a higher percentage of its graduates as federal clerks than other top law schools, such as the University of Pennsylvania Law School and Columbia Law School.

Costs
The total cost of attendance (indicating the cost of tuition, fees, and living expenses) at Notre Dame Law School for the 2020–2021 academic year is $84,230.

Facilities

Notre Dame Law School is located in the heart of Notre Dame's campus and it housed in the Eck and Biochini Halls, two buildings connected by a suspended walkway.

Biolchini Hall was designed by architect Charles Donagh Maginnis in 1930 and serves as a prominent example of collegiate Gothic architecture. It was renovated in 2010  thanks to a gift from Robert Biolchini and renamed to its current name. The Kresge Law Library is located in Biochini Hall, while most of the classrooms are in Eck Hall. Funding for the law library was provided by businessman S.S. Kresge, the founder of what is now Sears Holding Corporation. In 2004, the Kresge Law Library became one of the few academic law libraries to own more than 600,000 volumes. This was accomplished mainly under the tenure of the fifth law librarian, Roger Jacobs, who also served as head librarian of the Library of the United States Supreme Court.

Eck Hall was built in 2010. The $57-million, 85,000-square-foot building was connected to the original building through a suspended walkway that constitutes a common area. Eck includes both classrooms and faculty and administrative offices, as well as space for student services and activities. In addition to a 205-seat moot courtroom, the Patrick F. McCartan Courtroom, there are four lecture halls, five seminar rooms, and three skills training rooms available for classes and events. The construction of Eck and the connecting walkway to Biolchini also allowed for the creation of a new chapel dedicated to St. Thomas More. The building was named in honor of school graduate, benefactor, and advisor Frank E. Eck.

The Law School also hosts a legal aid clinic in South Bend.

Notable alumni
Despite having smaller graduating classes than most of America's top law schools, Notre Dame's alumni roster includes a range of distinguished jurists, advocates, politicians, and business leaders.

 Tae-Ung Baik – a legal scholar of international human rights law and Korean law; Professor of Law at the University of Hawaii at Manoa William S. Richardson School of Law; former Prisoner of Conscience
 Amy Coney Barrett – associate justice of the United States Supreme Court
 William Beauchamp – former president of the University of Portland
 G. Robert Blakey – author of the Racketeer Influenced and Corrupt Organizations Act 
 Joseph Cari Jr. – private equity investor, policy analyst, and philanthropist
 Tom Clements – quarterback coach for the Green Bay Packers
 N. Patrick Crooks – Justice of the Wisconsin Supreme Court
 John Crowley – biotechnology executive and inspiration for the film Extraordinary Measures
 Lucille Davy – Commissioner of the New Jersey Department of Education.
 Samuel L. Devine – former United States congressman (R-OH)
 John V. Diener – Mayor of Green Bay, Wisconsin
 Andy Dillon – former speaker of the Michigan House of Representatives, gubernatorial candidate, and former Michigan State Treasurer
 Larry Dolan – owner and President of the Cleveland Indians
 Joe Donnelly – former United States senator (D-IN)
 Clark Durant – CEO and founder of Cornerstone Schools (Michigan); political activist
 David Campos Guaderrama – United States district judge for the United States District Court for the Western District of Texas
 Patricia Anne Gaughan – United States district judge for the United States District Court for the Northern District of Ohio
 John M. Gearin – former United States senator (D-OR)
 Mark Gimenez – author of legal thrillers (his book The Color of the Law was a New York Times bestseller)
 William J. Granfield – former United States congressman (D-MA)
 Robert A. Grant – former United States congressman (R-IN) and Chief Judge for the United States District Court for the Northern District of Indiana
 Michael Fansler – justice of the Indiana Supreme Court
 José Reyes Ferriz – Mexican politician, affiliated to the Institutional Revolutionary Party (PRI), former Municipal President (mayor) of Ciudad Juárez
 Nora Barry Fischer – United States district judge for the United States District Court for the Western District of Pennsylvania
 Peter F. Flaherty – former mayor of Pittsburgh and deputy attorney general in the Carter administration
 Kevin Hasson – founder and President of The Becket Fund for Religious Liberty
 Donna Jean Hrinak – American diplomat, former U.S. Ambassador to Brazil (2002–2004), Venezuela (2000–2002), Bolivia (1997–2000), and the Dominican Republic (1994–1997).
 Harry Kelly – 39th Governor of Michigan from 1943 to 1947
 John Kilkenny – former judge on the United States Court of Appeals for the Ninth Circuit
 Peter King – United States Congressman (R-NY)
 David G. Larimer – a federal judge on the United States District Court for the Western District of New York
 Edward Leavy – Judge of the United States Court of Appeals for the Ninth Circuit and the United States Foreign Intelligence Surveillance Court of Review
 Paul M. Lewis – American diplomat (appointed by President Barack Obama to serve as United States Department of Defense's Special Envoy for Guantanamo Closure)
 Brendan Loy – a blogger who gained fame for his coverage of Hurricane Katrina
 Maureen Mahoney – former deputy solicitor general and well-known appellate lawyer, reported to have been among George W. Bush's Supreme Court candidates
 Eduardo Malapit – Hawaiian politician, Mayor of Kauai (1974–1982), first Filipino American mayor of any United States municipality
 John E. Martin – former chief justice of the Wisconsin Supreme Court
 Greg Marx – NFL player
 Romano L. Mazzoli – former United States congressman (D-KY) and immigration reform advocate
 James McCament – senior policy advisor, U.S. Customs and Border Protection 
 Judith A. McMorrow – torts scholar and law professor at Boston College Law School
 John Henry Merryman – Nelson Bowman Sweitzer and Marie B. Sweitzer Professor of Law at Stanford Law School
 Carol Ann Mooney – president of Saint Mary's College
 Brian Moynihan – president and CEO of Bank of America Corporation
 Joseph P. O'Hara – former United States congressman (R-MN)
 Graciela Olivarez – the first female and Latina graduate; Director of the Community Services Administration under Jimmy Carter
 Clifford Patrick O'Sullivan – former judge United States Court of Appeals for the Sixth Circuit
 Andrew Napolitano, Fox News senior judicial analyst and former judge
 Paul V. Niemeyer – Judge on the United States Court of Appeals for the Fourth Circuit
 Jerry Pappert – United States district judge of the United States District Court for the Eastern District of Pennsylvania and former Pennsylvania attorney general
 Renee Rabinowitz – psychologist and lawyer
 Keith James Rothfus – former United States congressman (R-PA)
 Margaret A. Ryan – judge on the United States Court of Appeals for the Armed Forces
 Yara Sallam – Egyptian feminist and human rights activist
 Janis Lynn Sammartino – United States district judge for the United States District Court for the Southern District of California
 John F. Sandner – former chairman of the Chicago Mercantile Exchange
 Lisa M. Schenck – military law scholar and judge of United States Court of Military Commission Review
 Thomas D. Schroeder – United States district judge for the United States District Court for the Middle District of North Carolina
 Thomas L. Shaffer – professor of legal ethics at Washington & Lee University and the University of Notre Dame
 Theresa Lazar Springmann – United States district judge for the United States District Court for the Northern District of Indiana
 Michael A. Stepovich – former governor of Alaska
 Luther Merritt Swygert – former judge on the United States Court of Appeals for the Seventh Circuit
 Martha Vázquez – United States district judge on the United States District Court for the District of New Mexico
 Pete Visclosky – United States Congressman (D-IN)
 Frank Comerford Walker – former United States Postmaster General and chairman of the Democratic National Committee
 Kevin Warren – Big Ten commissioner, former CEO of the Minnesota Vikings and the highest-ranking African-American executive working on the business side for an NFL team
 Ann Claire Williams – former judge on the United States Court of Appeals for the Seventh Circuit
 Charles R. Wilson – judge on the United States Court of Appeals for the Eleventh Circuit
 Mary Wittenberg – president and CEO of New York Road Runners (NYRR)
 Francis Parker Yockey – American attorney and far-right political philosopher
 Mary Yu – justice of the Washington Supreme Court
 William J. Zloch – United States district judge for United States District Court for the Southern District of Florida
 Chris Zorich – former Notre Dame and Chicago Bears star Defensive lineman

Notable faculty
Notable current faculty include:
 John Finnis – Australian philosopher, specializing in the philosophy of law (also Professor of Law at University College, Oxford)
 Nicole Stelle Garnett – legal scholar specializing in the areas of real estate, land use, urban development, local government law, and education
 Richard W. Garnett – First Amendment and criminal law scholar
 Jimmy Gurulé – former under secretary for enforcement, United States Department of the Treasury and former assistant attorney general for the United States Department of Justice
 William K. Kelley – former White House deputy counsel
 Mary Ellen O'Connell – international law scholar 
 Kenneth Francis Ripple – senior circuit judge on the United States Court of Appeals for the Seventh Circuit
 Amy Coney Barrett – associate justice of the United States Supreme Court
 Thomas Paprocki – American prelate of the Roman Catholic Church who serves as bishop of the Diocese of Springfield, Illinois

Notable former faculty include:
 G. Robert Blakey – author of the Racketeer Influenced and Corrupt Organizations Act (RICO) (also an alumnus)
 Anton-Hermann Chroust – German-American legal historian
 John H. Garvey – a professor at the University of Michigan Law School and Dean of the Boston College Law School
 Dan Flanagan – Justice of the Indiana Supreme Court
 M. Cathleen Kaveny – a scholar of law and theology at Boston College 
 Douglas Kmiec – U.S. Ambassador (ret.), confirmed 2009; assistant attorney general of the United States, confirmed 1988, White House fellow and special assistant to the secretary United States Department of Housing & Urban Development; dean and St. Thomas More Professor of Law, Catholic University of America
 Thomas F. Konop – former U.S. representative from Wisconsin
 Juan E. Méndez – human rights advocate known for work on behalf of political prisoners
 Carol Ann Mooney – president of Saint Mary's College in Notre Dame, Indiana
 John T. Noonan Jr. – senior United States federal judge on the United States Court of Appeals for the Ninth Circuit
 Charles E. Rice – legal scholar specializing in Natural Law Theory
 Thomas L. Shaffer – property law scholar
 Patrick J. Schiltz – United States district judge of the United States District Court for the District of Minnesota
 Larry Soderquist – securities law scholar
 Harris Wofford – former U.S. senator from Pennsylvania and civil rights activist
 Dudley G. Wooten – former U.S. representative from Texas.

Law journals
Notre Dame Law School publishes five student-run journals:
Notre Dame Law Review
Journal of Legislation
Notre Dame Journal of Law, Ethics & Public Policy
Notre Dame Journal of International and Comparative Law
 Notre Dame Journal on Emerging Technologies

References

External links

 
Catholic law schools in the United States
Law schools in Indiana
Educational institutions established in 1869
1869 establishments in Indiana